Alexander Keyssar (born May 13, 1947) is an American historian and the Matthew W. Stirling Jr. Professor of History and Social Policy at the Kennedy School of Government at Harvard University.

Life
Alex graduated summa cum laude with a degree in English Literature from Harvard College in 1969. In 1977 he graduated from Harvard University with a PhD in the History of American Civilization.  He taught at Brandeis University, Duke University, and Massachusetts Institute of Technology.

Awards
 1987 Frederick Jackson Turner Award; Philip Taft Labor History Prize for Out of Work
 2001 Beveridge Prize for The Right to Vote;  Eugene Genovese Prize for The Right to Vote
 2001 Pulitzer Prize finalist for The Right to Vote: The Contested History of Democracy in the United States
 2001 Los Angeles Times Book Award finalist for The Right to Vote: The Contested History of Democracy in the United States
2001  Parkman Prize, Finalist
 2005 Fulbright Specialists University of Lisbon

Works
 
  (2000)  revised 2009
 
 
 
"The Electoral College Flunks", The New York Review of Books, Volume 52, Number 5 · March 24, 2005

Anthologies

Co-author
 
 Inventing America, a text integrating the history of technology and science into the mainstream of American history
 Comparative and International Working-Class History. In 2004/5

References

External links

20th-century American historians
20th-century American male writers
Harvard University alumni
Brandeis University faculty
Duke University faculty
Massachusetts Institute of Technology faculty
Harvard Kennedy School faculty
Living people
1947 births
American male non-fiction writers